William David Davies  (1911–2001), often cited as W. D. Davies, was a Welsh Congregationalist minister, theologian, author and professor of religion in England and the United States.

Life

Davies was born in 1911 in Glanamman, Carmarthenshire, Wales. Educated at the University of Wales (BD, 1938) and at Cambridge (MA, 1942), he was ordained to the ministry of the Congregational Church in 1941 and served churches in Cambridgeshire until 1946. Concurrently, he engaged in research at the University of Cambridge under C. H. Dodd, a leading British New Testament scholar, and David Daube, a Jewish scholar who became Regius Professor of Civil Law (Oxford), but who wrote extensively on the New Testament from the vantage point of rabbinic sources.

Davies was then appointed Professor of New Testament Studies at Yorkshire United College in Bradford, Yorkshire, a post he held until 1950. In 1948, the University of Wales granted him the degree of Doctor of Divinity operis causa, the first time for that degree to be so granted. That year saw the publication of his first major book, Paul and Rabbinic Judaism: Some Rabbinic Elements in Pauline Theology, and in 1950 Davies was named Professor of Biblical Theology at Duke Divinity School. In 1955 he became professor of religion at Princeton University, where he was one of three professors (R. Y. B. Scott and Horton Davies the other two) who helped to inaugurate a graduate study program leading to a Doctor of Philosophy degree in religion – the first such program in a secular university in the United States. (See New York Times, July5, 1955.)

He then became Edward Robinson Professor of Biblical Theology at Union Theological Seminary in the City of New York, where he had important relationships with Reinhold Niebuhr and, across the street, with Louis Finkelstein (Pharisaism), Neil Gillman, Abraham Joshua Heschel (narrative and law), and Saul Lieberman (Hellenism in the land of Israel) – all housed at the Jewish Theological Seminary of America – as well as Salo Wittmayer Baron of Columbia University, up the hill. At Union, he supervised the dissertation of E. P. Sanders, which became the book The Tendencies of the Synoptic Tradition. Davies later returned to Duke as George Washington Ivey Professor of Advanced Studies and Research in Christian Origins.

Davies died on 12 June 2001 in Durham, North Carolina. He and his wife are buried in the graveyard at Hen Fethel (Old Bethel) church of Glanamman.

Work
Davies's period of study and research in Cambridge and his participation in Dodd's seminar led to his editing, together with Daube, of the volume of essays presented to C. H. Dodd in 1956, The Background of the New Testament and Its Eschatology. In his own published works, Davies's double interests – in the Jewish background of the New Testament and in the theological implications of this background – are especially exhibited. His books on Paul's writings and on the Sermon on the Mount (in Matthew) explore Pharisaic understandings of the Law (or Torah) in the "age to come" or messianic era – against the backdrop of developments and thought in Judaism not only during the time of Jesus but also in the closing decades of the first century (especially the destruction of Jerusalem and the Council of Jamnia).
''Paul and Rabbinic Judaism is one of the first books to rescue the apostle from the purely Greek background which earlier scholars had assumed for him. In The Setting of the Sermon on the Mount (1964), Davies sees a law which remains even under the covenant of grace and thus spans the canonical tensions between James and Paul.

Theologically, then, by reorienting views on Paul, and by bringing Pharisaic, nomistic themes in Matthew to the fore, Davies sought to pull together the various New Testament strands and aims at a comprehensive combination of Law and Gospel. As for church life, in Christian Origins and Judaism Davies comes to the conclusion that, in the New Testament (rather like the Old), there is no single fixed pattern of church order that is to be regarded as normative, only certain criteria to guide.

The Dodd-Daube-Davies troika led, in many ways, to the so-called New Perspective on Paul – probably what Davies meant when he eulogized Daube by saying that, when Daube called Christianity "a New Testament Judaism", he ushered in a "near-revolution" in New Testament studies. The leading light of the new/originalist Paul movement, E. P. Sanders, was a student of Daube and Davies, and Sanders's first book, Paul and Palestinian Judaism, is very much in dialogue with Davies's earlier Paul and Rabbinic Judaism. By no means are the two in agreement on all things, but Davies's work in de-Hellenizing Paul allowed for Sanders to approach the apostle dusted, scrubbed, and ready for fresh analysis.

Selected works

Books

Edited by

References

Further reading
Preliminary Inventory of the W.D. Davies (William David Davies) Papers, University Archives, Duke University]

1911 births
2001 deaths
People from Glanamman
Welsh theologians
Welsh Congregationalist ministers
New Testament scholars
British biblical scholars
Duke Divinity School faculty
Princeton University faculty
Union Theological Seminary (New York City) faculty
20th-century Welsh theologians
21st-century Welsh theologians
Corresponding Fellows of the British Academy